That's Life is a 1998 Italian comedy film directed by Aldo, Giovanni & Giacomo and Massimo Venier.

Plot
Aldo Baglio is detained for forgery of credit cards and has befriended his large cellmate Crapanzano; Giacomo Poretti is an upstanding police office that dreams of becoming a writer and lives with her sister's family, by which he is treated like an unwanted guest; Giovanni Storti is a children's toy inventor who is not loved by his wife, Elena. One morning, Aldo needs to be escorted to the courthouse. The designated police officers are Giacomo and his colleague Antonio. However, Giacomo is left alone by Antonio who goes to meet Elena instead, the latter cheating on Giovanni. During the drive, Aldo accidentally finds a gun in the glove compartment and decide to hijack the vehicle. Simultaneously, Giovanni's car is stolen under his eyes, so he stops Giovanni's police car that was passing by, ending up being taken hostage, too.

After a long and adventurous journey, the three are found by the police. After a chase, the car falls from a cliff, but they miraculously manage to save themselves. Aldo, Giovanni and Giacomo spend the night in an abandoned cemetery, where they meet Clara, a woman Aldo falls in love with. The three hitchhike back to Milan, when they realise they actually died in the car crash. Giovanni finds out that his newly widowed wife has an unfaithful relationship with Antonio, while Giacomo discovers that his room has been already rented out and all his possessions, including the book he was working on for a long time, had been thrown away. 

Clara reveals herself as an angel and, together with Aldo, helps the two take revenge before accompanying them to heaven.

Cast
 Aldo Baglio as Aldo
 Giovanni Storti as Giovanni
 Giacomo Poretti as Giacomo
 Marina Massironi as Clara
 Antonio Catania as Catanìa
 Big Jimmy as Crapanzano
 Elena Giusti as Elena, Giovanni's wife
 Augusto Zucchi as Police Commissioner
 Carlina Torta as Giacomo's sister
 Francesco Pannofino as Giacomo's brother in law
 Fabio Biaggi as Giacomo's nephew
 Mohamed El Sayed as Gaber
 Cesare Gallarini as Carmine
 Fabrizio Amachree as Platone
 Giovanni Cacioppo as man with broken car
 Bobby Rhodes as Sheriff

Box office
The film was the fourth highest grossing film of the year despite only being released during December. It went on to gross over $30 million in Italy.

Accolades

References

External links
 

1998 comedy films
1998 films
Films directed by Massimo Venier
Italian comedy films
1990s Italian-language films